Colonel Sir Douglas Glover,  (13 February 1908 – 15 January 1982) was a Conservative Party politician in the United Kingdom who served as Member of Parliament for Ormskirk, in Lancashire, from 1953 until 1970, and was a colonel in the Army during World War II. Sometime Chairman of the Conservative Party, and of the British Anti-Slavery Society.

Biography
Glover was educated at Giggleswick School, where he was later a Governor, and where the "Sir Douglas Glover Memorial Lecture" is held periodically in his memory.

On leaving school in 1925 he entered the family textile business, S.B. Glover & Co. Ltd., eventually becoming Managing Director. He also served for many years on the council of the Wholesale Textile Association of Great Britain.

At the outbreak of the Second World War in 1939, he was a subaltern in the 7th Battalion, The Manchester Regiment, TA; in 1945 he was appointed to the command of the 2nd Battalion Princess Louise's Kensington Regiment in North-West Europe; and from 1947-50 he commanded the 9th Battalion, The Manchester Regiment, TA. For his services in the Netherlands he was made Knight Officer of the Order of Orange-Nassau.

After the war he returned to the family business, whilst also contesting the parliamentary seats of Blackburn in 1945, and Stalybridge and Hyde in both 1950 and 1951 before being elected as the member for Ormskirk in a 1953 by-election. He was knighted in 1960.

In later life he moved to Switzerland where Baroness Thatcher, a close friend, would often spend her summer holidays visiting Sir Douglas and his wife.

References

External links 

Life of the Month - Colonel Sir Douglas Glover from Tameside Metropolitan Borough Council

1908 births
1982 deaths
Military personnel from London
Conservative Party (UK) MPs for English constituencies
UK MPs 1951–1955
UK MPs 1955–1959
UK MPs 1959–1964
UK MPs 1964–1966
UK MPs 1966–1970
Manchester Regiment officers
British Army personnel of World War II